Algibacter pectinivorans is a Gram-negative, rod-shaped and aerobic bacterium from the genus of Algibacter which has been isolatedd from seawater from the Jeju Island.

References

Flavobacteria
Bacteria described in 2011